Stig Berge (born 28 March 1942 in Meldal) is a retired Norwegian orienteer, and Master of Science in engineering.

Stig Berge won two gold at the World Orienteering Championships in 1970, one individually and one for the team relay. He also won silver at the 1972 World Orienteering Championships, and bronze in the relay in 1966. In the 1964 European Championships he won the silver in the relay.

Berge was crowned Norwegian champion 4 times between 1964 and 1971. He competed for Løkken IF and NTHI, the sports team at the Norwegian Institute of Technology, and was a part of the winning team at the national championships in 1963, 1965 and 1973.

In 1970 Berge was elected Norwegian Sportsperson of the Year.

References

1942 births
Living people
People from Meldal
Norwegian orienteers
Male orienteers
Foot orienteers
World Orienteering Championships medalists
Norwegian Institute of Technology alumni
Sportspeople from Trøndelag
20th-century Norwegian people